Shooting at the 2011 Canada Winter Games was held at Sackville High School in Lower Sackville, Nova Scotia.

The events were held during the first week between February 14 and 17, 2011.

Men's events

Women's events

References

Canada Winter Games
2011 Canada Winter Games
Shooting competitions in Canada